Véronique Claudel (born 22 November 1966 in Cornimont, France) is a former French biathlete. At the 1992 Winter Olympics in Albertville, she won a gold medal with the French relay team. She won an Olympic bronze medal in 1994.

References

External links
 

1966 births
Living people
French female biathletes
Olympic biathletes of France
Biathletes at the 1992 Winter Olympics
Biathletes at the 1994 Winter Olympics
Olympic gold medalists for France
Olympic bronze medalists for France
Olympic medalists in biathlon
Biathlon World Championships medalists
Medalists at the 1992 Winter Olympics
Medalists at the 1994 Winter Olympics
20th-century French women